Gaolan County is a county of Gansu Province, China, it is under the administration of the prefecture-level city of Lanzhou, the capital of Gansu, one of 58 counties of Gansu. Its postal code is 730200, and its population in 2019 was 147,000 people, a 13% decrease since 1999.

One of the touristic sites is an ancient pear orchard at Shichuan town, with trees up to 400 years old, and the orchard itself being established 600 years ago. The Great Wall of China crosses the Yellow River at Shichuan town as well, a few ruins of it are still visible.

Agriculture forms an important part of the economic output of the county. Supported by irrigation fed by the Yellow River, several kinds of fruit are grown. Other important sectors are livestock and livestock feed, pharmaceutics, paper and chemicals. The total economic output in Q1 2019 was 1.35 billion CNY.

Administrative divisions
Gaolan County is subdivided into 6 towns (containing 57 villages) and 5 communities.
Towns

Climate
On average 2768 hours of sunshine are received, and the frost-free period is 144 days.

References

  Official website (Chinese)

See also
 List of administrative divisions of Gansu

Gaolan County
Geography of Lanzhou